Actinochaetopteryx actifera is a species of parasitic fly in the family Tachinidae.

Distribution
China, Taiwan.

References

Diptera of Asia
Dexiinae
Taxa named by Charles Henry Tyler Townsend
Insects described in 1927